Felix Bryk (21 January 1882, in Vienna – 13 January 1957, in Stockholm) was a Swedish anthropologist, entomologist and writer.
In entomological circles, Bryk is best known as a lepidopterist; in anthropological history, for his studies in East Africa. He wrote on Carl Linnaeus and was a close friend of Curt Eisner, who worked with him on the Parnassinae.

Books by Bryk

Anthropology

 1934. Circumcision in Man and Woman: Its History, Psychology and Ethnology. New York: American Ethnological Press.
 1939. Dark Rapture: The Sex-life of The African Negro. Walden Publications.
 1964. Voodoo-eros: Ethnological Studies In The Sex Life Of The African Aborigines. New York: United Book Guild.
 1951. Linnée als Sexuallist.

Entomology

 1934. Lepidoptera. Baroniidae, Teinopalpidae, Parnassiidae pars I (Subfam. Parnassinae). Das Tierreich 64, Berlin & Leipzig.
 1935. Lepidoptera. Parnassiidae pars II (Subfam. Parnassinae). Das Tierreich 65, Berlin & Leipzig.
 1984. Lepidoptera. Parnassiidae pars II (Subfam. Parnassinae), 2nd ed. Berlin & Leipzig, LI.

References 
 Brinck, Per (1957) "In Memoriam: Felix Bryk," Opusc. Ent. 22: 119–22.

External links
DEI biografi List of obituaries. Portrait. Collection details

Swedish entomologists
Swedish lepidopterists
1882 births
1957 deaths
20th-century Swedish zoologists